Saqar Cheshmeh-ye Sofla (also Romanized as Şaqar Cheshmeh-ye Soflá and Şaghar Cheshmeh-ye Soflá; also known as Saqar Cheshmeh-ye Pā’īn) is a village in Salehabad Rural District, Salehabad County, Razavi Khorasan Province, Iran. At the 2006 census, its population was 93, in 17 families.

References 

Populated places in   Torbat-e Jam County